Bollmania is a genus of millipedes with around six species occurring from Central through East Asia, including Iran, Pakistan, Tajikistan, and China. The genus was established by entomologist Filippo Silvestri in 1896, and is named in honor of Charles Harvey Bollman. Bollmania is the sole genus of the family Caspiopetalidae.

Species and their distribution include:
Bollmania beroni - China
Bollmania gracilis - Iran
Bollmania kohalana - Pakistan
Bollmania nematogona - Iran
Bollmania nodifrons - Tajikistan 
Bollmania oblonga - Tajikistan
Bollmania serrata - Tajikistan

References

Millipede genera
Millipedes of Asia
Callipodida